Peter Ray Burton (4 April 1921 – 21 November 1989) was an English film and television actor.

Early life
Peter Ray Burton, was born in Bromley, Kent, to Frederick Ray Burton and Gladys Maude (née Frazer).

Career
He is perhaps best known for playing Major Boothroyd in the first James Bond film, Dr. No (1962). Burton made two uncredited reappearances in Bond films, first as an RAF officer in Thunderball (1965) and later as a secret agent in the satirical Casino Royale.

In The Scarlet and the Black, the 1983 made-for-television docudrama concerning British, Irish, and U.S. counterintelligence agents working to rescue c. 4,000 Allied prisoners-of-war from Nazi deportation, Burton played the role of English aristocrat and British diplomat D'Arcy Godolphin Osborne, the 12th (and last) Duke of Leeds.

Burton guest starred in a number of television shows, including The Avengers, The Saint, Return of the Saint and UFO.

Selected filmography

They Were Not Divided (1950) – Minor Role (uncredited)
What the Butler Saw (1950) – Bill Fenton
The Wooden Horse (1950) – Nigel
Tall Headlines (1952) – Graham Moore
The Stolen Plans (1952) – Dr. Foster
The Red Beret (1953) – Minor Role (uncredited)
The Heart of the Matter (1953) – Perrot (uncredited)
They Who Dare (1954) – Marine Barrett
The Green Scarf (1954) – Purser
Three Cases of Murder (1955) – Under Secretary for Foreign Affairs (segment "Lord Mountdrago")
Value for Money (1955) – Hotel Receptionist (uncredited)
Johnny, You're Wanted (1956)
Soho Incident (1956) – Inspector Collis
The Long Arm (1956) – Creasy 
Reach for the Sky (1956) – Peter / Coltishall Officer (uncredited)
Child in the Horse (1956) – Howard Forbes (uncredited)
The Betrayal (1957) – Tony Adams
Five on a Treasure Island (1957)
A Night to Remember (1958) – 1st Class Steward (uncredited)
The Night We Dropped a Clanger (1959) – 2nd Pilot
Sink the Bismarck! (1960) – Captain (First Destroyer)
Raising the Wind (1961) – 1st Viola
Dr. No (1962) – Major Boothroyd
The Iron Maiden (1962) – Thompson's Salesman
Lawrence of Arabia (1962) – Sheik in Arab Council (uncredited)
That Kind of Girl (1963) – Elliot Collier 
Thunderball (1965) – RAF Office in Car (uncredited)
Berserk! (1967) – Gustavo
Casino Royale (1967) – Agent (uncredited)
Amsterdam Affair (1968) – Herman Ketelboer
Doppelgänger (1969) – Medical Technician (uncredited)
Hell Boats (1970) – Admiral's Aide
All the Right Noises (1971) – Stage Manager
Carry on at Your Convenience (1971) – Hotel Manager
A Clockwork Orange (1971) – Junior Minister – Minister Frederick's Aid
The Love Box (1972) – Charles Lambert (Charles and Margery)
Leopard in the Snow (1978) – Mr. Framley
The Bitch (1979) – Hotel Night Manager
Richard's Things (1980) – Colonel
Inchon (1981) – Adm. Sherman
The Scarlet and the Black (1983) - D'Arcy Osborne, 12th Duke of Leeds
The Jigsaw Man (1984) – Douglas Ransom
The Doctor and the Devils (1985) – Customer
Number One Gun (1990) – Merlin (final film role)

References

External links

1921 births
1989 deaths
English male film actors
English male television actors
People from Bromley
Male actors from Kent
20th-century English male actors